The Coupe de France Final 1991 was a football match played at Parc des Princes, Paris, on 8 June 1991 that saw AS Monaco FC defeat Olympique de Marseille 1–0 thanks to a goal by Gérald Passi, assisted by Ramón Díaz.

Match details

See also
1990–91 Coupe de France

External links
Coupe de France results at Rec.Sport.Soccer Statistics Foundation
Report on French federation site

Coupe
1991
Coupe De France Final 1991
Coupe De France Final 1991
Coupe de France Final
Coupe de France Final